The 2018–19 Auburn Tigers women's basketball team represents Auburn University during the 2018–19 NCAA Division I women's basketball season. The Tigers, led by seventh-year head coach Terri Williams-Flournoy, play their home games at Auburn Arena as members of the Southeastern Conference. They finished the season 22–10, 9–7 in SEC play to finish in a tie for sixth place. They advanced to the quarterfinals of the SEC women's tournament where they lost to Texas A&M. They received an at-large bid to the NCAA women's tournament where they lost to BYU in the first round.

Previous season
They finished the 2017–18 season 14–15, 5–11 in SEC play to finish in tenth place. They lost in the second round of the SEC women's tournament to Tennessee.

Roster

Schedule

|-
!colspan=6 style=|Non-conference regular season

|-
!colspan=6 style=|SEC regular season

|-
!colspan=9 style=| SEC Women's Tournament

|-
!colspan=9 style=| NCAA Women's Tournament

Rankings
2018–19 NCAA Division I women's basketball rankings

References

Auburn Tigers women's basketball seasons
Auburn
Auburn Tigers women's basketball
Auburn Tigers women's basketball
Auburn